Cinco Ranch is a census-designated place and master-planned community located in the extraterritorial jurisdiction of the city of Houston within Fort Bend and Harris counties in the U.S. state of Texas. The population was 16,899 at the 2020 census. Cinco Ranch is considered to be part of the Greater Katy area and is roughly 10 miles southeast of the city of Katy.

History 

The Cinco Ranch community goes back to before Texas became a republic. In the 1820s, pioneer Moses Austin was granted by the Spanish government the authority to settle 300 families in the valleys of the Brazos and Colorado rivers. He died before he was able to accomplish this, but his son Stephen F. Austin was able to complete his father's wishes, even under the newly established Mexican government. One of the men who moved into these 300 slots of land (each one over ) was Randolph Foster, whose land spread across Fort Bend and Waller counties and upon which wild horses, deer, Native Americans and buffalo lived.

Foster's daughter married Thomas Blakeley, cattleman and future sheriff of Fort Bend County. Their son, Bassett Blakeley, took after his father and grandfather and soon grew into a cowboy and cattleman. Bassett Blakeley owned  of land and 14,000 head of Brahman cattle, along with his grandfather's land. The cowhands of his Blakeley Ranch annually drove 10,000 head of cattle to the railheads in Kansas.

In 1937, Blakeley sold the working ranch to William Wheless, who convinced four of his friends, J.S. Abercrombie, W.B. Pryon, H.G. Nelms and L.M. Josey—all, like him, wealthy from oil—to become his partners at the ranch. In a nod to its Spanish roots perhaps, they called it Cinco Ranch (cinco means "five" in Spanish). Only the Wheless family lived on the ranch, but all of the families visited on many holidays and weekends, making use of a huge clubhouse complete with two bedroom wings. The ranch was not merely involved in cattle—it also had several acres of rice—for years, the main output of Katy, Texas—and peanut production.

In February 1984, the largest raw land transaction in the history of Houston took place when Cinco Ranch Venture, consisting of U. S. Home, the Mischer Corporation, and American General Corporation, purchased Cinco Ranch for a  master-planned development. American General eventually bought out the other partners. In 1997, Cinco Ranch and other American General land development assets were purchased by Terrabrook, a wholly owned subsidiary of real estate investor Westbrook Partners. In 2003, Cinco Ranch and other Terrabrook developments were purchased by San Diego-based Newland Real Estate, LLC(Newland). In 2010, Newland purchased an additional  for future Cinco Ranch expansion. This land is located at the intersection of FM 1463 and Corbitt Road, and is not contiguous with the rest of Cinco Ranch. Cinco Ranch now totals  and is expected to have over 14,000 homes at build-out, which is currently projected to be around 2016.

Amenities

Cinco Ranch Pools
Cinco Ranch has 11 community pools:
 Water Park
 Beach Club
 Equestrian Village
 North Lake Village
 Greenway Village
 South Ranch
 Highland Park
 Ridgewood
 Springwood Lake House
 Rosewood
 Westridge Creek

Golf
The Golf Club at Cinco Ranch, owned by ARCIS Golf, is an  18-hole, par-71 daily fee course, with numerous bunkers and water hazards. The Golf Academy at Cinco Ranch hosts junior golf instructional clinics throughout the year and in the summer.

Parks and greenbelts
The parks of Cinco Ranch range from neighborhood pocket parks to major neighborhood recreation centers containing things like swimming pools and tennis courts. Lakefront parks are located along  South Lake, which offers fishing, sailing and paddle boating for residents. A  recreation area is nestled along the shore of Park Lake, the second-largest lake.

Cinco Ranch has a growing network of greenbelt trails, making it possible to jog, bike or rollerblade between almost anywhere in Cinco Ranch, including recreational facilities and schools in the community. The multi-station Exer-Trail is for workouts. There is also the Bayou Nature Trail, extending nearly four miles and preserving almost  of woodland and wetland habitat.  Plans are currently underway to connect the Bayou Nature Trail to the Buffalo Bayou Hike And Bike Trail.  This will allow residents of Cinco Ranch to ride their bikes from the Grand Parkway to Beltway 8 - a  bike trail.

YMCA
The Katy Family YMCA's  building has  of cardio and free weight equipment, including treadmills, bikes, stairclimbers, EFX Cross Trainers and a Cybex strength training circuit. The group exercise program offers more than 75 classes in aerobics, kickboxing, pilates, yoga among others.

The YMCA offers free Child Watch and Kid Watch services for members. The YMCA also offers Before and After School programs for children ages 5–12 in most KISD elementary schools. Other activities include Spring Break and Winter Break camps.

The YMCA's youth sports programs include soccer, flag football, volleyball, basketball and baseball. Other youth activities include Taekwondo, Dance, Teen Fitness and Babysitting Certification.

The YMCA was originally named after Ken Lay; in the wake of the corruption scandal that led to the downfall of Enron Corporation, a major Houston-based energy company which Lay headed, he asked for his name to be removed from the YMCA in June 2006, shortly before his death.

Katy Amateur Radio Society
The Katy Amateur Radio Society (KARS) has about 45 amateur radio operators. The KARS net operates every Tuesday at 8:00 PM on the KT5TX 147.20 MHz repeater. KARS monthly meetings are held on the 2nd Monday of every month at the West I-10 Fire Station #4 on Franz just east of Grand Parkway.

Geography

Cinco Ranch is located at  (29.741522, -95.758343).

According to the United States Census Bureau, the CDP has a total area of 4.9 square miles (12.8 km2). None of the area is covered with water.

Government and infrastructure
Fort Bend County does not have a hospital district. OakBend Medical Center serves as the county's charity hospital which the county contracts with. The hospital district for Harris County is Harris Health.

Demographics

As of the 2020 United States census, there were 16,899 people, 5,882 households, and 5,037 families residing in the CDP.

As of the census of 2000, there were 11,196 people, 3,375 households, and 3,064 families residing in the CDP. The population density was 2,270.0 people per square mile (876.8/km2). There were 3,594 housing units at an average density of 728.7/sq mi (281.5/km2). The racial makeup of the CDP was 87.92% White, 2.85% African American, 0.23% Native American, 6.63% Asian, 0.02% Pacific Islander, 1.06% from other races, and 1.30% from two or more races. Hispanic or Latino of any race were 5.84% of the population.

14% of Cinco Ranch residents report German ancestry, another 14% report English ancestry, and 10% report Irish. These are the three most common reported ancestries. Fourth is Asian, at 7%.

There were 3,375 households, out of which 63.7% had children under the age of 18 living with them, 84.9% were married couples living together, 3.8% had a female householder with no husband present, and 9.2% were non-families. 7.5% of all households were made up of individuals, and 1.2% had someone living alone who was 65 years of age or older. The average household size was 3.32 and the average family size was 3.52.

In the CDP, the population was spread out, with 38.3% under the age of 18, 3.8% from 18 to 24, 32.5% from 25 to 44, 22.2% from 45 to 64, and 3.2% who were 65 years of age or older. The median age was 35 years. For every 100 females, there were 99.9 males. For every 100 females age 18 and over, there were 98.9 males.

The median income for a household in the CDP was $111,517, and the median income for a family was $114,550. Males had a median income of $90,117 versus $42,304 for females. The per capita income for the CDP was $37,747. About 1.5% of families and 1.3% of the population were below the poverty line, including 1.1% of those under age 18 and 2.6% of those age 65 or over.

Ethnic groups

By 2017 the Cinco Ranch area and the vicinity was known as "Katyzuela" as there were about 5,000 ethnic Venezuelans living in the area.

Education

Primary and secondary schools

Public schools

Pupils in Cinco Ranch are zoned to schools of the Katy Independent School District in and around Cinco Ranch.

Elementary schools in Cinco Ranch:
 Betty Sue Creech Elementary School
 Edna Mae Fielder Elementary School
 Odessa Kilpatrick Elementary School
 James E. Williams Elementary School
 Jo Ella Exley Elementary School
 Stan Stanley Elementary School
 Tom Wilson Elementary School
 Fred & Patti Shafer Elementary School
 MayDell Jenks Elementary School

Other elementary schools serving Cinco Ranch:
 Michael L. Griffin Elementary School

Junior high schools in Cinco Ranch:
 Rodger & Ellen Beck Junior High School
 Beckendorff Junior High School
 Cinco Ranch Junior High School
 Seven Lakes Junior High School

Other junior high schools serving Cinco Ranch:
 Joe Adams Junior High School (opening Fall 2019)
 James & Sharon Tays Junior High School
 Garland McMeans Junior High School (Meadow Ridge, Park View, & Park Hollow neighborhoods)

High schools in Cinco Ranch
 Cinco Ranch High School (uninc. Fort Bend County)
 Seven Lakes High School (uninc. Fort Bend County)
 Obra D. Tompkins High School (uninc. Fort Bend County) 
Other high schools serving Cinco Ranch
James E. Taylor High School (Meadow Ridge, Park View, & Park Hollow neighborhoods)

Schools within the CDP boundaries are Fielder Elementary, Williams Elementary, McMeans Junior High (partial), and Cinco Ranch High.

Private schools
 The Village School in the Energy Corridor area has a bus service to Cinco Ranch.

Higher education
The Houston Community College System serves areas in Katy ISD, and therefore Cinco Ranch. The Northwest College's Katy Campus is in an unincorporated section of Harris County.

Public libraries
Cinco Ranch is served by the Cinco Ranch Branch Library of the Fort Bend County Libraries system, located across from Cinco Ranch High School and one block from Texas State Highway 99 (Grand Parkway). The library first opened as the Katy/Fort Bend Branch Library in a room on the campus of the University of Houston System at Cinco Ranch in June 1998. In 1999 the branch, which outgrew its first location, moved to the former Cinco Ranch development company sales office as a result of the efforts of the Katy/Fort Bend Friends. The community asked for a larger library, and Fort Bend County judge Jim Adolphus organized efforts to have a library established. Adolphus negotiated the donation of a library site from Terrabrook, a developer in Cinco Ranch, and secured a challenge grant. In addition, Adolphus and Fort Bend County judge candidate Bob Hebert co-hosted a fundraising gala for the challenge grant. The Cinco Ranch community, led by the Katy/Fort Bend Friends association, worked with Fort Bend County officials to find funds for the construction of a new library. The current  library opened on April 3, 2004.

Shopping
 LaCenterra at Cinco Ranch
 Katy Mills

References

External links

 Cinco Ranch developer site

Census-designated places in Fort Bend County, Texas
Census-designated places in Harris County, Texas
Census-designated places in Texas
Planned cities in the United States
Greater Houston